Doctor Rakhmabai is a 2016 Marathi-language biographical drama film, produced by Swapna Patker and directed by Anant Mahadevan. It stars Tannishtha Chatterjee as Doctor Rakhmabai and the music was composed by Rohan-Rohan. The film follows the real life story of Doctor Rakhmabai and how she won one of India's first divorce cases and then travelled to the UK to get her medical degree to become India's first female practicing doctor.

Cast
Tannishtha Chatterjee as Doctor Rakhmabai
Prasad Oak as Dr. Sarkharam Arjun 
Kavita Lad as Jayantibai
Santosh Juvekar as Dadaji 
Alexx O'Nell as Dr. David
Bharat Dabholkar as Grandfather
Sharad Ponkshe as Narayan Dharmaji
Elena Kasnatcheewa as Dr. Edith
Bhaktimahednra Pawar as Rakhmabai 11 years old
Kristen Peterson as Rakhmabais Lawyer
Aditi Sarangdhar as Vidya Oza

Film Festivals
 2017 IndoGerman Filmweek (DCSAFF)
 2017 Dallas Fort/Worth South Asian Film Festival (DFWSAFF)
 2017 Marathi International Film Festival (MIFF)
 2017 Jagran Film Festival (JFF)
 2017 Indian Film Festival of Melbourne (IFFM)
 2018 Lonavala International Film Festival India (LIFFI)

Awards and nominations

References

External links
 

2016 films
2016 drama films